In the early phases of the 2022 Russian Invasion of Ukraine, there were reported skirmishes between Russian and Ukrainian forces in southern Dnipropetrovsk Oblast and northern Poltava Oblast.

Dnipropetrovsk Oblast 
In 2022, when Russian troops completed the encirclement of Mariupol by securing northern towns, and clashing near Velyka Novosilka, clashes have been reported near Ternove, Berezove, Stepove and Maliivka, all in the Synelnykove Raion, bordering the Zaporizhzhia and Donetsk Oblast, currently partially occupied by Russian forces. Ukrainian forces reported small battles ongoing near the Ternove area on 1 March 2022. Other areas such as Novoheorhiivka and Zaporizke were possible occupied for an unknown period of time. Ukrainian forces claimed to have cleared out Russian troops from the area on March 14, 2022. These areas alongside Nikopol and Apostolove are still regularly shelled. On March 16, Russian forces spilled over from the Kherson Oblast into Hannivka and it was reportedly occupied. It was later liberated on 11 May 2022.

Poltava Oblast 
During the battles of Trostianets and Okhtyrka, in the Kharkiv Oblast, skirmishes have been reported near the border with Poltava Oblast. Notably, on February 27, 2022, then later on March 1 a Russian tank was reportedly spotted in the Psel River, in Hadiach. Later that month on March 4, a Russian convoy was captured travelling to Hadiach and through Vepryk. Subsequently, after clashes near Hadiach where hunters used rifles and machine guns, Russian troops were repelled and defeated. This was labelled as the "Hadiach Safari" . Some villages were occupied during this time, such as Bobryk and central parts of Verpryk.

Status 
As of 2023, Russian forces have no plans to advance in either of these Oblasts, and can't geographically invade Poltava Oblast without attacking Sumy, Chernihiv or west Kharkiv Oblast first. Russian positions in Enerhodar, near Velyka Novosilka and formerly near Arkhanhelske still keep shelling border areas and conducting missile strikes on large cities, notably in the Nikopol Raion, Including Nikopol, Marhanets and Tomakivka. On June 27, 2022, Russia struck Kremenchuk in the Poltava Oblast with two anti-ship missiles and destroyed a shopping mall reportedly holding military equipment. Later on the Russian strikes against Ukrainian infrastructure, missiles struck all across the country, including in Poltava and Dnipropetrovsk Oblast. Missiles hit Kremenchuk once again, as well as Poltava and Kryvyi Rih and Dnipro in the Dnipropetrovsk Oblast. On 14 January 2023, a missile hit Dnipro once again, in the Sobornyi District, destroying 236 apartments and damaging a building. Up to 46 people were killed.

Control of cities

Dnipropetrovsk Oblast

Poltava Oblast

See also 
 Russian-occupied territories of Ukraine
 Russian occupation of Crimea
 Russian occupation of Chernihiv Oblast
 Russian occupation of Donetsk Oblast
 Russian occupation of Kharkiv Oblast
 Russian occupation of Kherson Oblast
 Russian occupation of Kyiv Oblast
 Russian occupation of Luhansk Oblast
 Russian occupation of Mykolaiv Oblast
 Russian occupation of Sumy Oblast
 Russian occupation of Zaporizhzhia Oblast
 Russian occupation of Zhytomyr Oblast
 Snake Island during the 2022 Russian invasion of Ukraine

References 

Russo-Ukrainian War
Dnipropetrovsk Oblast
Poltava Oblast
Southern Ukraine campaign
Northeastern Ukraine campaign
Battles of the 2022 Russian invasion of Ukraine